Grand Marais/Cook County Airport  is a county-owned public-use airport located eight miles (13 km) northwest of the central business district of Grand Marais, a city in Cook County, Minnesota, United States. This airport replaced the former Devil's Track Municipal Airport (FAA: GRM) located on the shore of Devil's Track Lake, one mile (1.6 km) south of the current airport.

Although most U.S. airports use the same three-letter location identifier for the FAA and IATA, Grand Marais/Cook County Airport is assigned CKC by the FAA and GRM by the IATA (which assigned CKC to Cherkasy, Ukraine).

Facilities and aircraft
It has one runway designated 9/27 with a 4,199 x 75 ft (1,280 x 23 m) asphalt surface.

For the 12-month period ending July 31, 2005, the airport had 3,200 general aviation aircraft operations, an average of 267 per month.

In the summer of 2009, the airport received $95,000 for the FAA to conduct an environmental impact study on a proposed expansion to the airport. On May 26, 2009, airport manager Rod Roy told a Cook County board meeting that the expansion—which would widen the existing runway and increase its length to 5,000 feet from the existing 4,200 feet—would allow firefighting planes to operate from the airport. Roy also said that the project would cost approximately $12 million and might be spread out over three years. As of June 2014, no new construction had occurred, with the project cost estimated at $5 million. In April 2014, the City of Silver Bay transferred $150,000 to the airport for the project.

See also
Grand Marais/Cook County Seaplane Base

References

External links
Grand Marais Cook County Airport & Seaplane Base
  at Minnesota DOT Airport Directory

Airports in Minnesota
Buildings and structures in Cook County, Minnesota
Transportation in Cook County, Minnesota